Turkey has an embassy in Harare. Zimbabwe opened its embassy in Ankara on October 3, 2019.

Diplomatic relations  

Turkey and Zimbabwe generally had friendly relations until 1990. Turkey did not recognize Rhodesian Front-led UDI of Rhodesia because of the lack of racial accommodation in the Rhodesian Front. In Rhodesia — the approximately 5% white community had a system similar to Jim Crow that sustained racial discrimination. After Ian Smith as Prime Minister of Rhodesia declared Rhodesian independence on November 11, 1965, Turkey joined the British to exert pressure on Ian Smith’s government through economic sanctions. When the economic sanctions largely failed, the black population of Rhodesia began to organize and were assisted by Mozambique’s Frente de Libertação de Moçambique that allowed ZANU’s guerrillas to set up bases in neighboring Mozambique and declared war on Ian Smith’s Rhodesia, which allowed for majority-rule in Zimbabwe.

By 1992, Turkey provided £47 million out of the £900 million in total that the international community pledged as foreign aid to the government formed by Robert Mugabe, who initially won plaudits for protecting the white community in Zimbabwe.

Turkey’s relations with Zimbabwe became very tense when Robert Mugabe’s government started confiscating white-owned farms without compensation and later ordered Operation Murambatsvina (chiShona: “cleaning up the shit”) to attack the Shona people who lived in the shantytowns around Harare, bulldozing 100,000 homes. This led to, according to UN estimates, the death of 1.2 million people.

Economic relations 
 Trade volume between the two countries was US$17.7 million in 2018 (Turkish exports/imports: 5.9/11.8 million USD).

See also 

 Foreign relations of Turkey
 Foreign relations of Zimbabwe

References

Further reading  
 DeRoche, Andrew. Black, White, and Chrome: The United States and Zimbabwe, 1953 to 1998. Trenton, N.J.: Africa World, 2001.
 Gifford, Paul. “American Evangelicalism in Zimbabwe.” In Jan P. Nederveen Pietersee, ed. Christianity and Hegemony: Religion and Politics on the Frontiers of Social Change. New York: Berg, 1992.
 Horne, Gerald. From the Barrel of a Gun: The United States and the War Against Zimbabwe, 1965–1980. Chapel Hill: University of North Carolina Press, 2001.
 Lake, Anthony. The Tar Baby Option: American Policy toward Southern Rhodesia. New York: Columbia University Press, 1976.
 Stedman, Stephen Jay. Peacemaking in Civil War: International Mediation in Zimbabwe. Boulder, Colo.: Lynne Rienner, 1991.
 Thompson, Carol B. Challenge to Imperialism: The Frontline States in the Liberation of Zimbabwe. Boulder, Colo.: Westview, 1986.

Turkey–Zimbabwe relations
Turkey
Zimbabwe